Orani, officially the Municipality of Orani, is a 1st class municipality in the province of Bataan, Philippines. According to the 2020 census, it has a population of 70,342 people.

Geography

It is bounded on the north by Hermosa, south by Samal, west by Dinalupihan and east by Manila Bay. It has a total land area of  covering 29 barangays. The rest are classified as wetland.

According to the Philippine Statistics Authority, the municipality has a land area of  constituting  of the  total area of Bataan.

Climate

Barangays
Orani is politically subdivided into 29 barangays.

Demographics

In the 2020 census, Orani had a population of 70,342.

Economy 

Palay, coffee, vegetables, peanut, citrus trees and fruit trees are the major produce. Cutflowers like aster, chrysanthemum and gerbera are locally cultivated while bamboo and jungle vines can be gathered from Orani's forestlands. Aquamarine resources like milkfish, tilapia, prawn, crabs, mussels and oysters are caught in Orani's fishing grounds and fishponds.

Government

Pursuant to the Local government in the Philippines", the political seat of the municipal government is located at the Municipal Hall. In the History of the Philippines (1521–1898), the Gobernadorcillo was the Chief Executive who held office in the Presidencia. During the American rule (1898–1946) (History of the Philippines (1898-1946)), the elected Mayor and local officials, including the appointed ones held office at the Municipal Hall. The legislative and executive departments perform their functions in the Sangguniang Bayan (Session Hall) and Municipal Trial Court, respectively, and are located in the Town Hall.

Orani, Bataan's incumbent elected officials are - Mayor Efren Dominic E. Pascual, Jr. and Vice Mayor Emmanuel Bati Roman., including 8 Councilors or Sanguniang Bayan Members:   Jose Gener Quiambao Pascual, Maria Abba Narciso Sicat, Francis Sevilla Dela Torre, Jun Anthony Ignacio Reyes, Mayfair Bongco Sibug, Bonifacio Francisco Cruz Jr. ,Renato Rodriguez Bugay, Miguel Salonga Paredes. They hold office at the second floor of the Town Hall, particularly the Office of the Mayor and Sangguniang Bayan Session Hall, respectively.

The 2nd Municipal Circuit Trial Court of Orani-Samal, MCTC Judge Ma. Cristina J. Mendoza-Pizzaro holds office in her sala located at the second floor of the MTC building at the back of the Town hall.

The municipality passed an ordinance that protects its people against discrimination based on disability, age, civil status, health status, ethnicity, religion, sexual orientation, gender identity, and expression in January 2019 - becoming the first Bataan local government unit to do so.

Tourism

Orani's attractions, events and historical landmarks include:
 Orani People's Park, center of Poblacion, Plaza
 The 1714 Orani Church, commonly known as the "Our Lady of the Most Holy Rosary Parish Church of Orani" ("Our Lady of the Rosary of Orani", "Nuestra Señora del Rosario Parish Church", "Church of Orani" or "Virgen Milagrosa Del Rosario del Pueblo de Orani Shrine") is a Neoclassical (heritage) Diocesan Marian Shrine and Pilgrimage church (recognized by the 1959 Vatican's Papal Bull, located in Poblacion).
 Our Lady of Orani
 Death March Marker (Silahis), Bataan Death March. Kaparangan was used as a temporary prisoners’ camp by the Japanese soldiers starting on April 11, 1942, the second day of the infamous “Death March”. To commemorate the pitiful event, the National Historical Institute constructed a bronze memorial at the corner of Barangay Silahis and the Bataan National Road in 1987.
 Pawikan Festival

Education

Tertiary
Colleges and universities:
 Bataan Peninsula State University - Orani Campus

Secondary
 Academy of East Asia for Business and Technology (formerly Academy of Queen Mary)
 BLC International School (formerly Bataan Learning Center)
 Diocesan School of Bataan - Holy Rosary Parochial Institute
 Orani United Methodist Ecumenical School

High schools:
 Jose Rizal Institute - Orani
 Orani National High School
 Orani National High School - Annex 1
 Orani National High School - Pag-Asa Annex

Elementary
Elementary schools:
 Kaparangan Elementary School
 Orani United Methodist Ecumenical School
 Orani North Elementary School
 Orani South Elementary School
 Pagasa Elementary School
 Pantalan Bago Elementary School
 Pantalan Luma Elementary School
 Pulo Elementary School
 Tala Elementary School
 Talimundoc Elementary School
 Talimundoc Adventist Elementary School
 Tapulao Elementary School
 Paraiso Elementary School

Primary schools:
 Little Flower Kindergarten School
 Orani Day Care Center
 Orani North Kiddie School
 Santo Rosario Kindergarten School
 Sola Fide Montessori

Gallery

References

External links

[ Philippine Standard Geographic Code]

Municipalities of Bataan
Populated places on Manila Bay